Walter Kunz is a Swiss former swimmer. He competed in the men's 200 metre breaststroke at the 1948 Summer Olympics.

References

External links
 

Year of birth missing
Possibly living people
Olympic swimmers of Switzerland
Swimmers at the 1948 Summer Olympics
Place of birth missing (living people)
Swiss male breaststroke swimmers